Spotswood is a suburb of New Plymouth in the Taranaki Region of New Zealand. It is located to the west of the city centre.

History
The area in which Spotswood is located was acquired by the New Zealand Government in 1901 and was subdivided in 1902 to be sold in sections from May 1903.

Demographics

Spotswood had a population of 3,633 at the 2018 New Zealand census, an increase of 183 people (5.3%) since the 2013 census, and an increase of 165 people (4.8%) since the 2006 census. There were 1,416 households, comprising 1,806 males and 1,827 females, giving a sex ratio of 0.99 males per female. The median age was 37.9 years (compared with 37.4 years nationally), with 750 people (20.6%) aged under 15 years, 678 (18.7%) aged 15 to 29, 1,596 (43.9%) aged 30 to 64, and 612 (16.8%) aged 65 or older.

Ethnicities were 79.9% European/Pākehā, 25.8% Māori, 4.3% Pacific peoples, 4.6% Asian, and 2.9% other ethnicities. People may identify with more than one ethnicity.

The percentage of people born overseas was 14.9, compared with 27.1% nationally.

Although some people chose not to answer the census's question about religious affiliation, 51.7% had no religion, 35.3% were Christian, 0.9% had Māori religious beliefs, 0.3% were Hindu, 0.8% were Muslim, 0.9% were Buddhist and 2.1% had other religions.

Of those at least 15 years old, 375 (13.0%) people had a bachelor's or higher degree, and 684 (23.7%) people had no formal qualifications. The median income was $25,900, compared with $31,800 nationally. 300 people (10.4%) earned over $70,000 compared to 17.2% nationally. The employment status of those at least 15 was that 1,314 (45.6%) people were employed full-time, 414 (14.4%) were part-time, and 171 (5.9%) were unemployed.

Education
Spotswood College is a secondary (years 9–13) school with a roll of  students as of  It was founded in 1960. At one time it was divided as East and West school.

Spotswood Primary is a contributing primary (years 1–6) school with a roll of  students as of  The school celebrated its 50th jubilee in 2007.

Te Pi'ipi'inga Kakano Mai Rangiatea is a full primary (years 1–8) school with a roll of  students as of  It is a Kura Kaupapa Māori school which teaches in the Māori language.

All the schools are coeducational.

Notes

External links

 Spotswood College website
 Spotswood Primary School website

Suburbs of New Plymouth